Power of Persuasion is an original novel based on the U.S. television series Buffy the Vampire Slayer.

Plot summary

When dead guys start turning up as soon as the Moon family appears in Sunnydale Buffy knows that something is wrong. Mo, the mother, and her two daughters, Calli and Polly, all go to Sunnydale High. Within several days Calli and Polly have attracted a huge crowd of females. The Moons are trying to create a "Womyn Power" group at the school that basically detests guys for even living. Willow gets pulled into the group and Buffy resolves to stop the Moons before they brainwash all the girls and turn all the guys into blithering idiots.

Continuity

Supposed to be set late in Buffy season 3.

Canonical issues

Buffy novels such as this one are not usually considered by fans as canonical. Some fans consider them stories from the imaginations of authors and artists, while other fans consider them as taking place in an alternative fictional reality. However unlike fan fiction, overviews summarising their story, written early in the writing process, were 'approved' by both Fox and Joss Whedon (or his office), and the books were therefore later published as officially Buffy merchandise.

External links

Reviews
Slayerlit.us - Review of this book by Shiai 
Litefoot1969.bravepages.com - Review of this book by Litefoot
Nika-summers.com - Review of this book by Nika Summers

Books based on Buffy the Vampire Slayer
1999 novels